Zolimidine (zoliridine, brand name Solimidin) is a gastroprotective drug previously used for peptic ulcer and gastroesophageal reflux disease.

See also 
 Imidazopyridine

References 

Abandoned drugs
Drugs for acid-related disorders
Imidazopyridines
Benzosulfones